Septoria selenophomoides is a fungal plant pathogen infecting orchids. It causes leaf spots, starting with small yellowish lesions on the plant's leaves and darkening to brown or black. If the infection develops further, the leaves and fruit fall from the orchid and spread the infection.

References

selenophomoides
Fungal plant pathogens and diseases
Orchid diseases
Fungi described in 1955